Sanulla Makti Thangal (Arabic:سيّد سناء الله مكتي, Malayalam:സനാഉല്ലാ മക്തി തങ്ങൾ ) was the renaissance leader of Muslim society in Malabar of British India and the advocate of western education among the backward community of Mappila. He was notable as the first Muslim scholar and first Salafi leader to know the significance of the progressed western culture and the necessity of the western education to realize the reformation of knowledge. He commenced his career as the excise inspector under British government in India and later resigned from the post to defend the Christian missionaries. He dreamt about new Muslim society who will imbibe the advantages of western culture without getting rid of the valuable Islamic culture.

Sayyid Sanaulla Makti Thangal is often referred as one of the personalities influenced the Moplah Riots along with Sayyid Alavi Thangal, Veliyankode Umar Khasi and Sayid Fazal Pookoya Thangal.

Early life
He was born in 1847 born as the son of Ahmed Thangal, follower of Veliyankode Umer khasi at Veliyankode, Malappuram. He fetched his primary education in Arabic literature from his father and later admitted in various Darse (Masjid based college) at Veliyankode, Ponnani and Maranchery. He was enrolled in Chavakkad Higher elementary school and possessed good command in Hindustani, Persian, English, Tamil and his mother tongue Malayalam. Besides imbibing a deep knowledge in Islam religion, he was blessed with comprehensive  knowledge in Christianity and Hinduism.  He was influence by science, logic and philosophy and inclined to conquer more branches of western education. Thanks to his good command in English and Persian, he was appointed as the excise inspector in Malabar region and later he resigned because the Britishers came to India for three reasons and they were one to have business with India because spices and herbs were there only in India and the another reason was to spread Christianity and the other one was for ruling India so the Christian missionaries started to preach and convert Muslims to Christianity and another reason why thangal resigning was lack of knowledge about Islam in Muslims

In the reformation field
He commenced in society a new pattern of reformation, which not rejects the primitive culture, approach and concepts, but realize the role of west education in the progress of backward community. He made herculean task to check the progress of Christian missionary in Malabar regions and made a counterattack on their attempt to tarnish the image of the Islamic prophet Muhammad. After realizing the precarious ignorance of the Moplha society (Muslim society) even in their mother tongue Malayalam, he initiated a massive project to aware people about role of education and empowerment. He opposed armed and non-armed struggle against the ruling power and hailed his hatred towards the inclination of Muslims to be martyred and campaigned for progress of society.
He realized necessity of the women empowerment and adopted a new pattern, which was based on Islamic concept of gender discrimination and motivated the women horde to be scholar by pointing the role model in Ayish, the wife of  Muhammad.

His passion towards Muhammad 
Out of deep love and respect to prophet Muhammad  he adopted a strict stance in defending the attempt to tarnish Muhammad's image. In order to counter the ambush of Christian missionaries against Muhammad, he collected a large  fund from Muslims and published a series of publication, named as Nabi Nanayam. 
He defended an usage,  which was published in Sadashibamani and was not apt for the respect of Muhammad in unique and ever shining way.

Kerala Muslim renaissance
Even though he was reformist, he never lost his lineage of orthodox Muslims and was the promoter of Islamic ideology. He motivated women empowerment, which is based on gender discrimination of Islamic line and was influenced by the primitive ways of lauding prophet. He narrated about Muhammad in his masterpiece, Nabi Nanayam, In which he answered to Christian missionary for their questions about Islam and prophet Muhamed. And he calls Muslims to return to  the "Thouheed". And he tried to clear the misconceptions of the peoples about Islam and Prophet Muhammed, so he is considered as the pioneer of  Kerala muslim renaissance and the 'Islahi movements of Kerala' (a part of the Muslim renaissance of the community in kerala ).

Literary works
He was the first Malabar Muslim to write a book in native language of Malayalam named Kadora Kodaram in year 1884. In 1885 he wrote another book named "Paropakaari" and it was noted as initiative for the reformation work. Muslim Janavum Vidyabyasavum (Muslims and education) was one of his notable work promoting the educational reformation of society

Demise 
He died on 18 September 1912.

See Also (Social reformers of Kerala) 

 Sree Narayana Guru
 Dr. Palpu
 Kumaranasan
 Rao Sahib Dr. Ayyathan Gopalan
 Brahmananda Swami Sivayogi
 Vaghbhatananda
 Mithavaadi Krishnan
 Moorkoth Kumaran
 Ayyankali
 Ayya Vaikundar
 Pandit Karuppan

References

History of Kerala
Mappilas
Indian Muslims
Malayalam-language writers
Muslim writers
Islam in Kerala
1847 births
1912 deaths